Chembaruthi is a 1992 Indian Tamil-language romantic drama film written and directed by R. K. Selvamani and produced by Kovai Thambi. The film stars Prashanth and Roja (in her Tamil debut), while Mansoor Ali Khan, Nassar, Radha Ravi, and Bhanumathi play supporting roles. The film was partially re-shot in Telugu as Chamanti. The music was composed by Ilaiyaraaja, while editing was done by V. Udhayashankar and cinematography by Ravi Yadav. The film released on 17 April 1992 and was a super hit at the box office. It was remade in Hindi as Aao Pyaar Karen (1994), and in Bengali Bangladesh as Ontore Ontore (1994).

Plot 
The film is a story about the love of two teenagers from different social classes. Raja is the grandson of a rich businesswoman and is settled in London. He comes to a village in India to see his grandmother. Chembaruthi is the sister of a poor fisherman Pandy, who works in Raja's grandmother's house. The couple first sees each other during Raja's birthday party, and it is love at first sight for Raja. They meet often, and their love grows by leaps and bounds. Raja's grandmother wants him to marry Pinky, the daughter of a rich seafood exporter named Murugan. At the party, they announce Raja's interest in Pinky. Raja realizes that his relationship with the daughter of a poor fisherman is not taken kindly by his eccentric grandmother, and when she discovers Raja's love for Chembaruthi, she accuses Pandy of using his sister's beauty and charm to trap Raja for his money. She even offers Pandy cash to have Chembaruthi stop seeing Raja. Pandy feels very humiliated by this accusation and reciprocates by insulting Raja's grandmother. Their conversation enters a deadlock, spelling doom for Raja and Chembaruthi's tender love.

Raja's grandmother then engages him to be married to Pinky in order to establish business ties with her rich father. Murugan also has his sister betrothed to a fisherman named Kumar, but Raja and Chembaruthi run away from home. Raja's grandmother announces a reward for anyone who can help find her grandson. Murugan decides that he wants the money. He and his goons find the lovers, abduct them, and lock them up in a boat. Raja fights for Chembaruthi and saves her from drowning in the sea. Raja's grandmother then realizes that their love is very strong, and she does not want to stand in the way of their happiness. She and Pandy accept their love and give their blessings to the union.

Cast

Soundtrack 
The music was composed by Ilaiyaraaja. The lyrics were written by Vaali, Muthulingam and Piraisoodan. Ilayaraja completed the soundtrack within 40 minutes. The film had a song "Pudhu Naal Idhuve" which was not part of soundtrack but was included only in film.

Reception 
The Indian Express wrote the film is "akin to formula Hindi film" and praised the performances, music and cinematography.

References

External links 
 

1990s Tamil-language films
1992 films
1992 romantic drama films
Films directed by R. K. Selvamani
Films scored by Ilaiyaraaja
Indian romantic drama films
Tamil films remade in other languages